The 2020–21 season is Melbourne Victory's 16th season since its establishment in 2004. The club will be participating in the A-League for the 16th time.

Players

Transfers

Transfers in

Transfers out

Contract extensions

Technical staff

Pre-season and friendlies

Competitions

Overview
{|class="wikitable" style="text-align:left"
|-
!rowspan=2 style="width:140px;"|Competition
!colspan=8|Record
|-
!style="width:30px;"|
!style="width:30px;"|
!style="width:30px;"|
!style="width:30px;"|
!style="width:30px;"|
!style="width:30px;"|
!style="width:30px;"|
!style="width:50px;"|
|-
|A-League

|-
!Total

A-League

League table

Matches

Statistics

Appearances and goals
Players with no appearances not included in the list.

Goalscorers

Disciplinary record

Clean sheets

References

Melbourne Victory FC seasons
2020–21 A-League season by team